Suches is an unincorporated community in Union County, Georgia, United States.

The local school is Woody Gap School, the smallest public school in the state of Georgia. The historical marker in front of the school lists it as the homestead of Joseph E. Brown, governor of Georgia during the Civil War and devout believer in slavery.

The community most likely is named after the local Suches family. It is the birthplace of Arthur Woody, a forest ranger who was a key figure in the early history of Chattahoochee National Forest. Suches is approximately one mile from the Appalachian Trail (AT) as it passes through Woody Gap.

Until recently, the annual Tour de Georgia bicycle race has gone through Suches on its way to Dahlonega.

There are two main highways that travel through the area: State Highway 60 and State Highway 180.

References

External links 

 Places and Happenings around Suches, GA
 Suches, Ga
 Woody Gap School
 Two Wheels of Suches

Unincorporated communities in Union County, Georgia
Unincorporated communities in Georgia (U.S. state)